The end of the British Mandate for Palestine was formally made by way of the Palestine bill of 29 April 1948. A public statement prepared by the Colonial and Foreign offices confirmed termination of British responsibility for the administration of Palestine from midnight on 14 May 1948.

Background 
Mandatory Palestine was created at the end of the First World War out of the dissolution of the Ottoman Empire. In 1920 Britain was awarded the mandate for Palestine by the League of Nations, to administer until such time as the territory was "able to stand alone". 
The 1939 White Paper provided for the establishment of an independent Palestinian state within 10 years. As explained by Malcolm MacDonald to the 1939 meeting of the Permanent Mandates Commission it was not clear at that stage what form such a state would take.

The February 1945 Yalta Conference agreed that arrangements would be made to provide for UN trusteeships for existing League Mandates.

In July 1945, the Harrison Report was published, describing the conditions of the displaced persons camps in post-World War II Europe.

In October 1945, then Foreign Secretary Bevin told the cabinet that Britain intended to turn over the Palestine problem to the UN except that Britain would be accused of evading its responsibilities if it did not first make some efforts of its own in resolving the situation.

The League of Nations at its last meeting on 18 April 1946 agreed to liquidate and transfer all of its assets to the UN. The assembly also passed a resolution approving and welcoming the intention of the British government to grant independence to Transjordan.

The report of the Anglo-American Committee of Inquiry was published 20 April 1946.

That part of the mandate in respect of Transjordan legally ended on 17 June 1946 with the ratification of the Treaty of London.

In July 1946, a committee created to establish how the Anglo-American proposals would be implemented proposed the Morrison–Grady Plan.

Following the failure of the 1946–1947 London Conference on Palestine, at which the United States refused to support the British leading to both the Morrison–Grady Plan and the Bevin Plan being rejected by all parties, the British decided to refer the question to the UN on 14 February 1947.

The United Nations Special Committee on Palestine (UNSCOP) was created on 15 May 1947, reported on 3 September 1947 and on 29 November 1947, the United Nations Partition Plan for Palestine was passed. It recommended that the Mandate terminate as soon as possible and not later than 1 August 1948.

Two weeks later, on 11 December, Colonial Secretary Arthur Creech Jones announced that the British Mandate would terminate on 15 May 1948.

UN 
The British requested that the Palestine question be placed on the agenda of the Second Regular Session of the General Assembly and that a Special Session be convened to constitute a Special Committee to prepare for Assembly consideration of the subject. The First Special Session of the General Assembly met between 28 April and 15 May 1947 to consider the British request. An attempt by the five Arab members of the UN (Egypt, Iraq, Lebanon, Saudi Arabia and Syria) to add an item to the agenda addressing the "termination of the Mandate over Palestine and the declaration of its independence" was unsuccessful.

Following the publication of the UNSCOP report, the Ad Hoc Committee on the Palestinian Question was formed by a vote of the Second Regular Session of the General Assembly on 24 September 1947.

Palestine 

Regulations governing land transfers and clauses relating to immigration were implemented although by 1944, 24,000 of 75,000 immigration certificates still remained for use. The immigration limits were relaxed to allow immigration at the rate of 18,000 a year as a reaction to the situation of Jewish refugees in Europe.

With the end of the war, the new Labour Government, led by Clement Attlee, with Ernest Bevin as Foreign Secretary, decided to maintain the White Paper policy.

Immediately after the UN resolution, the 1947–1948 civil war in Mandatory Palestine broke out between the Arab and Jewish communities. On the last day of the Mandate, the creation of the State of Israel was proclaimed, and the 1948 Arab–Israeli War began. In March 1948, the British Cabinet had agreed that the civil and military authorities in Palestine should make no effort to oppose the setting up of a Jewish State or a move into Palestine from Transjordan.

Sir Henry Gurney served as Chief Secretary in Palestine from October 1946 to termination and wrote a diary covering the period. A review by historian Rory Miller speaks approvingly of editor Golani's decision to include detailed scholarly annotations and perspectives to the diary.

Arab response 
On 22 March 1945, the Arab league was founded. The Arab Higher Committee (AHC) was reconstituted in November 1945 to represent Palestinian Arabs  and met at the beginning of May 1946 to consider their response to the publication of the Anglo American report. The Arab states reacted with summit meetings at Inshas at the end of May and Bloudan in June.
After the failure of the London Conference and UN referral the Arabs continued to press their demand for an immediate independent Arab Palestine.

Jordan 
Abdullah had connections with Zionists and Palestine over many years, an account is given by historian Mary Wilson  Historians have described a meeting between Abdullah and the Jewish Agency on 17 November 1947 during which Abdullah is alleged to have reached an understanding in regard to Abdullah's intent to occupy the Arab territories of the partition plan.
Following the end of the mandate, the Jordanian Arab Legion, under the leadership of Sir John Bagot Glubb, known as Glubb Pasha, was ordered to enter Palestine and secure the UN designated Arab area.

Zionist response 
In May 1942, the Biltmore Conference in New York City with 600 delegates and Zionist leaders from 18 countries attending, demands "that Palestine be established as a Jewish Commonwealth" (state), rather than a "homeland".

American response 
At the end of August 1945, U.S. President Harry Truman issues a statement requesting the British government to admit 100,000 Jewish refugees in Europe into Palestine.
On 14 May 1948, the United States de facto recognized the provisional Jewish government contemporaneously declared (de jure recognition on 31 January 1949).

Legal issues and reasons to terminate
Law professor Shabtai Rosenne says that there is no clear answer as to why the British took this step and lists miscalculation as well as political and military fatigue among others.
Ravndal cites works from the 1980s establishing that the British were motivated by "economic necessity and plain exhaustion" but then goes on to posit that the British were motivated by a Cold War desire to secure Britain's interests in the rest of the Middle East.
A summary of different views is given by Benny Morris.

Mandates were intended to end with the independence of the Mandated territory. The British government had taken the position that there was nothing in law to prevent termination due to frustration of purpose. In the event, the UNSCOP report recommended both that the Mandate be terminated and independence granted at the earliest practicable dates with a transition period between these events.

Notes

References 

End
Palestine
British Empire
Former countries in the Middle East
British Mandate for Palestine
British Mandate for Palestine
1940s in the British Empire
States and territories established in 1920
States and territories disestablished in 1948
1920 establishments in the British Empire
1948 disestablishments in the British Empire
Mandatory Palestine in World War II